The Karsino was a hotel on Tagg's Island in the London Borough of Richmond upon Thames which stood from 1912 until 1972.

History
It was built for Fred Karno by architect Frank Matcham in 1912. When World War I started in 1914, the resort was popular with returning military officers and their families and staged picnics and entertainment at times for wounded soldiers. In 1925 Fred Karno declared bankruptcy. It changed hands several times and in 1972 the hotel, dilapidated, was demolished. Fire destroyed all the other buildings at the resort.

An 11-minute film of the recreation on the lower canalised Thames in 1924 has footage devoted to the Karsino, preceded by the intertitle (titlecard): "There are ample facilities for gaiety here too – for opposite is the famous Karsino, on Tagg's Island".

In popular culture
The inside of the hotel was used in the filming of the Billy Boy gang fight in Stanley Kubrick's 1971 movie A Clockwork Orange.

The theatre of the Karsino was used in Tommy Steele's 1971 TV film 'In Search of Chaplin.'

The Karsino is referenced in the original lyrics of Jack Buchanan's "Battling Butler" (renamed Battling Buttler for its transfer to the US ), where the song "Dancing Honeymoon" alludes to the "old Karsino / We know on the Isle of Tagg".

External links
'Eccentric Club Entertain Wounded Soldiers', 1916, British Film Institute archive.

References

1912 establishments in England
1972 disestablishments in England
Hotel buildings completed in 1912
Resorts in the United Kingdom
Defunct resorts
Hotels disestablished in 1972